Beyliks of Canik is a name given to a group of small Turkoman principalities in northern Anatolia during the fourteenth and fifteenth centuries. Anthony Bryer connects the toponyme Chanik with the name "Chani" which the Laz people call themselves.

Background 

After the battle of Kösedağ in 1243, the Ilkhanid Mongols achieved a hegemony over Anatolia. The Seljuk sultans became the puppets of Ilkhanids and the former generals of Seljuks as well as Turkoman tribes within Seljuk realm who accepted the suzerainty of Ilkhanids, established themselves as semi independent principalities called beylik. However, the middle Black Sea region of Anatolia lacked a dominant leader, and a series of beyliks emerged, ruled by the members of the same family. Those beyliks were smaller than the beyliks in the other regions of Anatolia and they were nominal vassals of Eretna. They lived in a frequent warfare and their history is highly turbulent. Historians call all of them Beyliks of Canik. (Nowadays Canik is the name of a mountain system in the Middle Black Sea region as well as one of the second level municipalities of Greater Samsun)

The beyliks 
In the following table the names usually refer to the founder of the beylik, (where the suffix "...oğulları" means "sons of") with the exception of Bafra which is the name of the capital city of the beylik.

All of the beyliks were incorporated in the Ottoman Empire.

The monarchs
Some members of the dynasties are:
Kutluşah:
Hacı Kutlu Şah Bey (1340-1361)
Hacı Şâdgeldi Bey (1361-1381)
Fahrüddîn Ahmed Bey (1381-1393)

Tacettinoğulları (Tâcüddînoğulları)
Tâcüddîn Doğan Şah (1308-1346)
Tâcüddîn Bey (1346-1387)
Mahmud Çelebi (1387-1423)
Hüsâmüddîn Hasan Bey (1423-1425)

Hacıemiroğulları (Bayramoğulları)
Hacı Bayram Bey (1313-1331)
Hacı Emir Bey (1331-1361)
Süleyman Bey (1386-1392)

References

Anatolian beyliks
States in medieval Anatolia
History of Samsun Province
History of Amasya Province
1300s establishments in Asia
1460 disestablishments in Asia
Chepni people